Aristofusus couei, common name the Yucatan spindle, is a species of sea snail, a marine gastropod mollusk in the family Fasciolariidae, the spindle snails, the tulip snails and their allies.

Description

Distribution
This species occurs in the Caribbean Sea off Yucatan, Mexico.

References

 Vermeij G.J. & Snyder M.A. (2018). Proposed genus-level classification of large species of Fusininae (Gastropoda, Fasciolariidae). Basteria. 82(4-6): 57-82.

External links
 Petit de la Saussaye S. (1853). Description de deux coquilles nouvelles appartenant aux genres Fusus et Bulimus. Journal de Conchyliologie. 4(3): 249-251, pl. 8

couei
Gastropods described in 1853